The State Register of Heritage Places is maintained by the Heritage Council of Western Australia. , 74 places are heritage-listed in the Shire of Plantagenet, of which six are on the State Register of Heritage Places.

List

State Register of Heritage Places
The Western Australian State Register of Heritage Places, lists the following six state registered places within the Shire of Plantagenet:

Shire of Plantagenet heritage-listed places
The following places are heritage listed in the Shire of Plantagenet but are not State registered:

References

Plantagenet
Plantagenet